The tennis competitions at the 1997 Mediterranean Games in Bari, Italy from June 14–19.

Athletes competed in 4 events.

Medal summary

Medalists

Medal table
Key:

References

Sports at the 1997 Mediterranean Games
1997
1997 in tennis